Aulacoptera philippinensis is a moth in the family Crambidae. It was described by George Hampson in 1912. It is found on Negros Island in the Philippines.

References

Moths described in 1912
Pyraustinae
Moths of Asia